Frederick or Fred Watkins may refer to:

 Frederick Watkins (Royal Navy officer) (1770–1856), British Royal Navy admiral
 Frederick Watkins (priest) (1808–1888), English Anglican clergyman, friend of Charles Darwin
 Fred Watkins (footballer) (1878–1957), Welsh footballer
 Fred Watkins (politician) (1883–1954), British trade unionist and Member of Parliament for Hackney Central